Africodytes is a genus of beetles in the family Dytiscidae, containing the following species:

 Africodytes kongouensis Bilardo & Rocchi, 1999
 Africodytes maximus Biström, 1995
 Africodytes rubromaculatus Biström, 1988
 Africodytes silvestris (Bilardo & Pederzani, 1978)

References

Dytiscidae genera